Gota Cola is a three piece band from Brisbane, Queensland made up of Tylea, Lexie and Skritch. In 1998 Gota Cola released a self-titled EP through Valve. Their debut album, Guaranteed Rustless, was produced by Magoo and was released in 2001.

Members
 Tylea Croucher
 Skritch
 Lexie Gillespie

Discography
 Gota Cola EP (1998) - Valve
 Guaranteed Rustless (2001) - Valve

References

Australian alternative rock groups
Musical groups from Brisbane